Juan Miguel Jaime (born January 1, 1993) is an Argentine footballer who plays as a midfielder for Deportes Copiapó of the Chilean First Division B. He previously played for Lanús, Douglas Haig and Talleres de Remedios de Escalada in the top three divisions of the Argentine league.

Life and career
Jaime was born in Monteros, in the Tucumán Province of Argentina, where he attended the Escuela Nacional Superior de Comercio. He played youth football for Ñuñorco, and in 2005 was selected for a Liga Tucumana under-13 representative team to travel to Europe, visiting Spain and Denmark before playing in Sweden in tournaments including the Gothia Cup. Still young enough to be part of the next season's team, Jaime helped them reach  the Gothia Cup final, in which, according to La Gaceta, he gave his all in scoring the equaliser; the match was settled in a penalty shoot-out in which the Liga Tucumana beat their Italian opponents 7–6. His performances earned him a move to Buenos Aires-based Primera División club Boca Juniors, but he stayed only a few months, and by 2007 was in the youth system of another major club, Lanús.

He made his debutand only league appearancefor Lanús on March 16, 2012, starting in a 1–0 Primera División defeat at home to Argentinos Juniors. Jaime spent the 2013–14 Primera B Nacional season on loan at Douglas Haig; he made 17 league appearances and was a regular in the matchday squad. In 2016, Jaime joined Talleres de Remedios de Escalada, newly promoted to the third-tier Primera B Metropolitana. He spent a year with Talleres, for whom he scored his first senior goal to seal a 2–0 home win against Deportivo Armenio on May 6. In January 2017, Jaime signed for Deportes Copiapó of the Primera B de Chile.

References

External links
 

1993 births
Living people
Argentine footballers
Club Atlético Lanús footballers
Club Atlético Douglas Haig players
Talleres de Remedios de Escalada footballers
Deportes Copiapó footballers
Argentine Primera División players
Primera Nacional players
Primera B Metropolitana players
Primera B de Chile players
Expatriate footballers in Chile
Argentine expatriate footballers
Association football midfielders
Sportspeople from Tucumán Province